Diána Póth (born 6 August 1981) is a Hungarian former competitive figure skater. She is a two-time Karl Schäfer Memorial silver medalist and a two-time Hungarian national champion. She also competed briefly for Austria.

Personal life 
Póth was born on 6 August 1981 in Budapest, Hungary. She moved to Austria in 2001 and returned to Hungary in October 2002. Her mother is Austrian. Her father was a hockey player.

Póth is married to professional footballer Gábor Gyepes.

Career 
Póth began figure skating at the age of four to combat her nerves. Her first coach was Tamara Téglássy, with whom she was most successful as a junior. After the 1998 Worlds Championships, where she finished 10th, she switched coaches and began to train with Andras Szaraz and Eszter Jurek. Póth achieved her best result, 4th, at a European Championships in 1999.

Póth won two Hungarian national titles in 1999 and 2000. She competed in the Austrian Championships in 2002.

After a couple of injuries, Póth switched coaches again and began training with Jeranjak Ipakjan and Gurgen Vardanjan. In April 2007, Poth retired from competition. She began coaching at a Cardiff skating club. One of her students won the junior national championship.

Programs

Results 
GP: Grand Prix; JGP: Junior Series/Junior Grand Prix

References

External links

Navigation

1981 births
Living people
Hungarian female single skaters
Austrian female single skaters
Hungarian people of Austrian descent
Hungarian emigrants to Austria
Figure skaters from Budapest